WBBD - Bootcity!: The Remix Album is a remix album released by R&B group Bell Biv DeVoe. It was released on August 27, 1991 via MCA Records, and was composed of remixes of songs from the group's debut album Poison. The album reached No. 18 on the Billboard 200. It was certified gold on October 23, 1991.

Bobby Brown, Johnny Gill and Ralph Tresvant appear on "Word to the Mutha!", making for a New Edition reunion.

Critical reception
The Rolling Stone Album Guide wrote that "the beefed up beats are generally a plus," but panned the New Edition reunion. The Sun Sentinel called the album "unimaginative," writing that "buried underneath all this remixing, heavy studio gimmickry, scratching and technological gymnastics, the group's vocals are barely audible." The Globe and Mail wrote that "deejays and those who live to dance will revel in the furious, bottom-heavy rhythms."

Track listing
 Intro/D.J. Opening
 Word to the Mutha! 
 Ain't Nut'in' Changed! 		
 B.B.D. (I Thought It Was Me)? [DJ Mo Grind Time]
 Do Me! [Smooth] 	
 I Do Need You 		
 Interview/Uhh Ahh 	
 Let Me Know Something! 	
 She's Dope! [EPOD Mix] 	
 Do Me! [Mental]
 When Will I See You Smile Again? [DJ Close] 			
 Poison [London Style]

Certifications

References

Bell Biv DeVoe albums
1991 remix albums
MCA Records remix albums